Cristian David Ortega Fontalvo (born 29 September 2000) is a Colombian track cyclist, who specializes in sprinting events. He competed in the 2022 UCI Track Cycling World Championships.

Major results

2021
 Junior Pan American Games
1st  Keirin
1st  Sprint
1st  Team sprint
 National Championships
2nd Keirin
2nd Team sprint
3rd Kilometer
3rd Sprint
2022
 UCI Nations Cup
1st  Kilometer, Glasgow
2nd  Team sprint, Cali
 Pan American Championships
2nd  Kilometer
 Bolivarian Games
1st   Team sprint 
 National Championships
2nd Kilometer
2nd Sprint
2nd Team sprint

References

External links

2000 births
Living people
Colombian track cyclists
Colombian male cyclists
Sportspeople from Barranquilla
21st-century Colombian people